The National Football League (NFL) and the National Collegiate Athletic Association (NCAA) are respectively the most popular professional and amateur football organizations in the United States. The National Football League was founded in 1920 and has since become the largest and most popular sport in the United States. The NFL has the highest average attendance of any sporting league in the world, with an average attendance of 66,960 persons per game during the 2011 NFL season. While the NFL championship game, the Super Bowl, is a large sporting event in club sports it does not compare in popularity to cricket and international football (soccer), which both have billions of spectators. It is played between the champions of the National Football Conference (NFC) and the American Football Conference (AFC), and its winner is awarded the Vince Lombardi Trophy.

Collegiate football ranks third in overall popularity in the United States, behind baseball and pro football. The NCAA, the largest collegiate organization, is divided into three Divisions: Division I, Division II and Division III. Division I football is further divided into two subdivisions: the Football Bowl Subdivision (FBS) and the Football Championship Subdivision (FCS). The FBS subdivision is divided even further, in effect though not formally, into the Power Five and the Group of five. The champions of Division I-FCS, Division II and Division III are determined through playoff systems, and the Division I-FBS champion was determined through the Bowl Championship Series (BCS). Division I-FBS switched to a four-team playoff system in 2014.

Major rule differences
Some of the major rule differences between NFL and college football include:

Overview

The NFL consists of thirty-two clubs divided into two conferences of sixteen teams each. Each conference is divided into four divisions of four clubs each.
The NFL season format consists of a four-week preseason, a seventeen-week regular season, and a twelve-team single-elimination playoff culminating in the Super Bowl, the league's championship game.
College teams mostly play other similarly sized schools through the NCAA's divisional system. Division I generally consists of the major collegiate athletic powers with larger budgets, more elaborate facilities, and more athletic scholarships. Division II primarily consists of smaller public and private institutions that offer fewer scholarships than those in Division I. Division III institutions also field teams, but do not offer any scholarships.
Football teams in Division I are further divided into the Bowl Subdivision (consisting of the largest programs) and the Championship Subdivision.
The Bowl Subdivision (FBS) previously did not have an organized tournament to determine its champion; instead, teams competed in post-season bowl games.  Up through the 2013 season, the BCS National Championship game determined the national champion.  The game featured the #1 and #2 teams in the BCS rankings, a mixture of computer and human polls ranking the top teams in the country.  Beginning in the 2014 season, a 4-team playoff now determines the national champion.  The four teams competing in the College Football Playoff are decided by a 13-member selection committee using a complex set of selection criteria and each committee member valuing certain selection criteria differently. These criteria include strength of schedule, conference championships, win–loss record, on-field play, non-conference schedule and much more.  The importance of traditional major bowl games will be preserved by using 2 of the 6 major bowls as the semi-finals of the playoff while the remaining 4 will incorporate traditional conference "tie-ins" to schedule teams in each bowl game.
The Championship Subdivision utilizes a college football playoff, the NCAA Division I Football Championship.  As of 2014, 24 teams are selected for the playoff.  Similar to the NCAA College Basketball Tournament, each conference champion received an automatic bid to the tournament.  The remaining tournament berths are awarded as "at-large" selections by a selection committee.

Metros table

Metros

Chicago
In 2002, the Soldier Field was closed and rebuilt with only the exterior wall of the stadium being preserved. It was closed on Sunday, January 20, 2002, a day after the Bears lost in the playoffs. It reopened on September 27, 2003 after a complete rebuild (the second in the stadium's history). Many fans refer to the rebuilt stadium as "New Soldier Field". During the  season, the Bears played their home games at the University of Illinois' Memorial Stadium in Champaign, where they went 3–5.

Cleveland
Cleveland Stadium hosted the annual Notre Dame/Navy college football game 11 times: in 1932, 1934, 1939, 1942, 1943, 1945, 1947, 1950, 1952, 1976 and 1978. The games were well attended, with an average attendance of 69,730 and a high of 84,090 fans for the 1947 game, which was won by Notre Dame 27-0. The only Great Lakes Bowl was held there in 1947. Local colleges Case Institute of Technology and Western Reserve University used the field from time to time as well. The Illinois Fighting Illini played the Penn State Nittany Lions there in 1959. The Ohio State Buckeyes played in the stadium four times. The first was in a 1942 win over Illinois before 68,656, the second a 1943 loss to Purdue, and the third a 1944 victory over Illinois. The final college football contest played there was on October 19, 1991, when the Northwestern Wildcats played a "home" game against the Buckeyes. While Northwestern received the home team's share of the gate receipts, the crowd was mostly Ohio State fans. The Ohio Classic college football game was held at FirstEnergy Stadium in both 2004 and 2005. In September 2006, it hosted the Bowling Green Falcons–Wisconsin Badgers game. In 2007, it began hosting the Patriot Bowl, a season-opening game between Army and Akron. Boston College defeated Kent State in the second Patriot Bowl on August 30, 2008. In 2009, it hosted the Ohio State–Toledo game. On October 14, 2008 CSU President Michael Schwartz stated "he wants a blue ribbon panel to give him a recommendation on the football team before July 1, 2009, when he is scheduled to retire. He also said the program will have to be structured to pay for itself." The Football establishment issue became an official item on the Cleveland State University, Student Government Association election ballot. From Monday April 12 at 12:01 AM until Friday April 14 the student body voted on the issue. By Friday evening, the results indicated that 68.7% of the student population favored establishment of a football team. Furthermore, the student body was asked if they were willing to pay a fee for Division I non-scholarship football in addition to any potential, future tuition increases that may be instituted by the University. The student body responded with 55.6% of the vote being no.

Detroit
In college sports, Detroit's central location within the Mid-American Conference has made it a frequent site for the league's championship events. The MAC Football Championship Game has been played at Ford Field in Detroit since 2004, and annually attracts 25,000 to 30,000 fans. The NCAA football Little Caesars Pizza Bowl is held at Ford Field each December. Wayne State University competes in Division II in football.

Green Bay
When built, Lambeau Field was also slated to be used by Green Bay's public high schools, as old City Stadium had been. However, a key 1962 game between the Packers and Detroit Lions was affected when two high schools played in the rain the preceding Friday, damaging the field. After that, Lombardi asked the schools to avoid using Lambeau, however both Southwest High and West High played there until a high school stadium was built in the late 1970s. In 1970, Green Bay's Premontre High School (the alma mater of Lombardi's son, Vince Jr., which has since been merged into Notre Dame Academy) hosted (and won) the state private school football championship. In 1982 and 1983, St. Norbert College hosted Fordham University (Lombardi's alma mater) in benefit games to fight cancer. Shortly after the 2006 Wisconsin–Ohio State hockey game, newspaper reports said the Wisconsin football team might be interested in moving a non-conference road game to Lambeau Field. In 2016, Lambeau Field hosted the Wisconsin Badgers vs. LSU Tigers in the 2nd of a two-game series starting in 2014, where the game was in Houston at Reliant Stadium.

Jacksonville
College sports, especially college football, are popular in Jacksonville. The city hosts the Florida–Georgia game, an annual college football game between the University of Florida and the University of Georgia, and the TaxSlayer Bowl, a post-season college bowl game. Jacksonville's two universities compete in NCAA Division I: the University of North Florida Ospreys and the Jacksonville University Dolphins, both in the ASUN Conference.

Kansas City
Arrowhead Stadium serves as the venue for various intercollegiate football games. It has hosted the Big 12 Championship Game five times. On the last weekend in October, the Fall Classic rivalry game between Northwest Missouri State University and Pittsburg State University takes place here. The Bearcats of Northwest and Gorillas of Pitt State are frequently ranked one-two in the MIAA conference. In 2005, other games at Arrowhead included Arkansas State playing host to Missouri, and Kansas hosting Oklahoma.

Los Angeles

Los Angeles is home to the Los Angeles Rams and Los Angeles Chargers who play out of SoFi Stadium in Inglewood. Between 1994 and 2016 the Los Angeles market had no NFL teams after the Rams who had been in the market since 1946 moved from suburban Anaheim to St. Louis, Missouri, and the Los Angeles Raiders who had been in the market since 1982 returned to Oakland, California after 1994. The Rams returned from St. Louis in 2016 and the Chargers moved from San Diego in 2017 after being founded in Los Angeles as charter member of the AFL in 1960.

Los Angeles had multiple teams in the multiple American Football Leagues, prior to the NFL. The Los Angeles Wildcats, also called "Wilson Wildcats", were a traveling team for the first AFL in 1926. The Los Angeles Bulldogs were members of AFL  (1937) and a minor AFL (1939) before joining the Pacific Coast Professional Football League.

The Los Angeles area has hosted the Super Bowl seven times. The Los Angeles Memorial Coliseum hosted Super Bowl I in 1967 and Super Bowl VII in 1973. The Rose Bowl hosted Super Bowl XI in 1977, Super Bowl XIV in 1980, Super Bowl XVII in 1983, Super Bowl XXI in 1987 and Super Bowl XXVII in 1993. The city ranks third on the list of having hosted the most number of Super Bowls, after Miami and New Orleans.

The metropolitan area boasts nine NCAA Division I athletic programs. The best-known are the two whose football teams compete in the top-level Football Bowl Subdivision, both of which are in the city of Los Angeles proper:

 UCLA Bruins – Winners of more national team championships than any other college program (105), and 259 individual national championships (364 total national championships).
 USC Trojans – Winners of 91 national team championships, and 357 individual national championships (448 total national championships).

USC has 11 national championships in football and, together with Notre Dame, has more Heisman Trophy winners than any other school.

New York City
The first college football game played in Yankee Stadium was a 3-0 Syracuse victory over Pittsburgh on October 20, 1923. When an ill Ruth could not lead the Yankees to the World Series in 1925, college football took center stage at Yankee Stadium that fall. The fiercely competitive Notre Dame–Army game moved to Yankee Stadium, where it remained until 1947. In the 1928 game, with the score 0–0 at halftime, legendary Notre Dame coach Knute Rockne gave his "win one for the Gipper" speech (with reference to All-American halfback George Gipp, who died in 1920); Notre Dame went on to defeat Army, 12–6. The 1929 game between the two teams had the highest attendance in the series at 79,408. The 1946 Army vs. Notre Dame football game at Yankee stadium is regarded as one of the 20th century college football Games of the Century. Notre Dame played 24 games at Yankee Stadium, going 15–6–3. Army played 38, compiling a 17–17–4 record (including the best-attended game, on December 1, 1928 when Army lost to Stanford 26–0 before 86,000 fans). New York University played more games there than any other school, 96, using it as a secondary home field from 1923 to 1948, with a record of 52–40–4. Nearby Fordham University played 19 games there, going 13–5–1. Eight college football games were played at Yankee Stadium on Thanksgiving Day, the first seven by New York University.  Perhaps, the most famous Thanksgiving Day game was the first.  Oregon State Agricultural College (now Oregon State) was the first West Coast team to travel across the country and play an East Coast team.  8–1 NYU was a 3–1 favorite to beat 5–3 OSAC, but Oregon State upset the hometown favorites 25–13. Will Rogers lamented what the "Oregon apple knockers" had done to his "city slickers" in a column after the game.  After the 1928 game, NYU beat Carnegie Tech (now Carnegie Mellon University) in 1931 and 1932, defeated Fordham in 1936, lost to Carnegie Tech in 1929, and lost to Fordham in 1934 and 1935.  In the eighth game, in 1963, Syracuse beat Notre Dame, 14–7. This was a rematch following the teams' controversial 1961 game won by Notre Dame, 17–15. The Gotham Bowl was scheduled to premiere at Yankee Stadium in 1960, but was canceled when no opponent could be found for Oregon State University. The 1961 game was moved to the Polo Grounds, and when just 6,166 people came to Yankee Stadium for the 1962 game, in which the University of Nebraska defeated the University of Miami, 36–34, the Gotham Bowl was never played again. The Miami-Nebraska game remains the only college bowl ever played at the stadium. In 1969, Notre Dame and Army reprised their long series at the Stadium (1925–1946 except 1930) with one final game. Starting in 1971, the Stadium hosted the Whitney M. Young Urban League Classic, a game between historically black colleges, often featuring Grambling State University of Louisiana, coached by Eddie Robinson, the first college coach to win 400 games. The Classic helped to spread the fame of Grambling and other similar schools. Yankee Stadium hosted its final Classic during the 1987 season, also the last time a football game was played there. Grambling lost to Central State University of Ohio, 37–21. The Classic has been held at Giants Stadium and MetLife Stadium in New Jersey's Meadowlands Sports Complex ever since, though the Yankees remain a supporter of the event. In 1926, after negotiations failed with the fledgling NFL and the Chicago Bears, Red Grange and his agent C.C. Pyle formed the first American Football League and fielded a team called the New York Yankees based in Yankee Stadium. The league failed after only one year, but the team continued as a member of the NFL for two seasons before ceasing operations. A second New York Yankees football team, not related to the first, split its home games between Yankee Stadium and Downing Stadium as it competed in the second AFL in 1936 and 1937. A third AFL New York Yankees took the field in 1940 and became the New York Americans in 1941. The New York Yankees of the All-America Football Conference (AAFC) played their home games at Yankee Stadium from 1946 to 1949. Following the 1949 season, the NFL New York Bulldogs acquired many of the players from the 1949 Yankees.  Using the name the New York Yanks they played two seasons at Yankee Stadium, 1950 and 1951. The New York Giants of the NFL played their home games at Yankee Stadium from 1956 to 1973. On December 28, 1958, Yankee Stadium hosted the NFL championship game, frequently called "The Greatest Game Ever Played". The Baltimore Colts tied the Giants, 17–17, on a field goal with seven seconds left. Led by quarterback Johnny Unitas, the Colts won in overtime, 23–17. The game's dramatic ending is often cited as elevating professional football to one of the United States' major sports.  Additionally, one of the most notable plays in NFL history occurred at Yankee Stadium on November 20, 1960 when the Philadelphia Eagles' Chuck Bednarik forcefully tackled the Giants' Frank Gifford in the last minute of a close game, forcing a fumble recovered by the Eagles that clinched the victory for Philadelphia and ultimately helped the Eagles dethrone the two-time defending champion Giants as NFL Eastern Division champions. The hit left Gifford with a concussion and forced his temporary retirement from football for the remainder of the 1960 season and all of the 1961 season. The Giants played their first two home games at Yankee Stadium in 1973, concluding their tenancy on September 23 with a 23–23 tie against the Philadelphia Eagles. In October, they moved to the Yale Bowl in New Haven, Connecticut, for the rest of the season.

Phoenix
The Arizona Cardinals moved to Phoenix from St. Louis, Missouri in 1988 and currently play in the Western Division of the National Football League's National Football Conference. The team, however, has never played in the city itself; they played at Sun Devil Stadium on the campus of Arizona State University in nearby Tempe until 2006. Sun Devil Stadium held Super Bowl XXX in 1996 when the Dallas Cowboys defeated the Pittsburgh Steelers. The Cardinals now play at State Farm Stadium in west suburban Glendale. University of Phoenix Stadium hosted Super Bowl XLII on February 3, 2008, in which the New York Giants defeated the New England Patriots. It is also the home of the annual Tostitos Fiesta Bowl, a college football bowl game that is part of the Bowl Championship Series (BCS). The University of Phoenix Stadium hosted Super Bowl XLIX in 2015, in which the Patriots defeated the Seattle Seahawks.

San Francisco Bay Area
All three football-playing schools in the Bay Area are in the Football Bowl Subdivision, the highest level of NCAA college football. The California Golden Bears and Stanford Cardinal compete in the Pac-12 Conference, and the San Jose State Spartans compete in the Mountain West Conference. The Cardinal and Golden Bears are intense rivals, with their football teams competing annually in the Big Game for the Stanford Axe. One of the most famous games in the rivalry is the 1982 edition, when the Golden Bears defeated the Cardinal on a last-second return kickoff known as "The Play".

Saint Louis
Saint Louis University (SLU) plays NCAA Division I sports as a member of the Atlantic 10 Conference. SLU dropped football as an intercollegiate sport in 1949, but SLU is best known for its men's basketball and men's soccer programs. The Edward Jones Dome hosted the first Big 12 Conference football championship game in 1996 (Nebraska versus Texas). The third game, in 1998, was also held in the dome (Kansas State versus Texas A&M). The dome has also been a neutral site for regular-season college football matchups between the University of Illinois and the University of Missouri, promoted locally as the "Arch Rivalry". Missouri has won all six games (2002, 2003, 2007, 2008, 2009 & 2010).

Washington, DC
On December 20, 2008, Washington hosted its first college bowl game, the EagleBank Bowl, at RFK Stadium. The first match-up saw Wake Forest defeat Navy, 29–19. After the sponsorship deal between the bowl organizers and the area financial institution EagleBank expired following the 2009 edition, the game was rechristened as the Military Bowl presented by Northrop Grumman, thanks to a new sponsorship deal with the major defense contractor.

References

External links
NCAA Football vs. NFL: The Age Old Debate | Bleacher Report
NFL Vs. NCAA Football: Which Is Better?
College football is better than NFL, and it's not even close
Passion, tradition elevate college football over NFL
25 maps that explain college football - SBNation.com
24 maps that explain the NFL - SBNation.com

National Football League
College football in the United States
National Football League